Gisela (born 820) was the youngest daughter of Louis the Pious and his second wife, Judith of Bavaria. She married the powerful and influential Eberhard, Duke of Friuli, later canonized as Saint Eberhard, with whom she had several children including King Berengar I of Italy, Margrave of Friuli. Gisela was renowned for her piety and virtue, much like her namesake, Gisela (the sister of Charlemagne), who had chosen the religious life from girlhood.

Her dowry consisted of many rich domains including the fisc of Cysoing; located at the center of the country of Pèvele, Cysoing was one of the most beautiful fiscs in the region and became one of her and Eberhard's regular residences. They founded a monastery there, in the 850s, which was not completed until after their deaths.

The nunnery San Salvatore was given to her after Ermengarde, wife of Lothair I. For a time, she served as both abbess and rectrix.

She dedicated herself to the education of her and Eberhard's many children.

Her and her husbands will is one of the most famous wills of the ninth century and is dated between 863 and 864.

Issue 

 Unruoch III of Friuli, born c. 840
 King Berengar I of Italy, born c. 845
 Ingeltrude
 Hatwige of Friuli
 Judith of Friuli

Ancestry

Bibliography 

820s births
870s deaths
9th-century French nuns
Carolingian dynasty
French Christian abbesses
Women from the Carolingian Empire
Daughters of emperors
Daughters of kings